Wushu, for the 2013 Bolivarian Games, took place from 17 November to 19 November 2013. The venue used for this sport was the Nuestra Señora del Rosario Colesium in Chiclayo.

Medal table
Key:

Medal summary

Men

Women

References

Events at the 2013 Bolivarian Games
Bolivarian Games
2013 in wushu (sport)